The tumor necrosis factor receptor superfamily (TNFRSF) is a protein superfamily of cytokine receptors characterized by the ability to bind tumor necrosis factors (TNFs) via an extracellular cysteine-rich domain. With the exception of nerve growth factor (NGF), all TNFs are homologous to the archetypal TNF-alpha. In their active form, the majority of TNF receptors form trimeric complexes in the plasma membrane. Accordingly, most TNF receptors contain transmembrane domains (TMDs), although some can be cleaved into soluble forms (e.g. TNFR1), and some lack a TMD entirely (e.g. DcR3). In addition, most TNF receptors require specific adaptor protein such as TRADD, TRAF, RIP and FADD for downstream signalling. TNF receptors are primarily involved in apoptosis and inflammation, but they can also take part in other signal transduction pathways, such as proliferation, survival, and differentiation. TNF receptors are expressed in a wide variety of tissues in mammals, especially in leukocytes.

The term death receptor refers to those members of the TNF receptor superfamily that contain a death domain, such as TNFR1, Fas receptor, DR4 and DR5. They were named after the fact that they seemed to play an important role in apoptosis (programmed cell death), although they are now known to play other roles as well.

In the strict sense, the term TNF receptor is often used to refer to the archetypal members of the superfamily, namely TNFR1 and TNFR2, which recognize TNF-alpha.

Members
There are 27 family members, numerically classified as TNFRSF#, where # denotes the member number, sometimes followed a letter.

References

Further reading

External links
 

TNF receptor family
Apoptosis
Protein superfamilies
Single-pass transmembrane proteins